In the formal sciences, the domain of discourse, also called the universe of discourse, universal set, or simply universe, is the set of entities over which certain variables of interest in some formal treatment may range.

Overview

The domain of discourse is usually identified in the preliminaries, so that there is no need in the further treatment to specify each time the range of the relevant variables. Many logicians distinguish, sometimes only tacitly, between the domain of a science and the universe of discourse of a formalization of the science.

Examples
For example, in an interpretation of first-order logic, the domain of discourse is the set of individuals over which the quantifiers range. In one interpretation, the domain of discourse could be the set of real numbers; in another interpretation, it could be the set of natural numbers.

Universe of discourse
The term "universe of discourse" generally refers to the collection of objects being discussed in a specific discourse. In model-theoretical semantics, a universe of discourse is the set of entities that a model is based on. The concept universe of discourse is generally attributed to Augustus De Morgan (1846) but the name was used for the first time by George Boole (1854) on page 42 of his Laws of Thought. Boole's definition is quoted below. The concept, probably discovered independently by Boole in 1847, played a crucial role in his philosophy of logic especially in his principle of wholistic reference.

Boole’s 1854 definition

See also

Domain of a function
Domain theory
Interpretation (logic)
Quantifier (logic)
Term algebra
Universe (mathematics)

References

Semantics
Predicate logic